The Ministry of Labour is a Ministry of the Government of Maharashtra. 
state. 

The Ministry is headed by a cabinet level Minister. Suresh Khade is Current Minister of Labour Government of Maharashtra.

Head office

List of Cabinet Ministers

List of Ministers of State

References 

Government of Maharashtra
Government ministries of Maharashtra
Maharashtra